Lake Interstate is a  fishing lake located in Michigan near the state's capitol, Lansing.

Overview
Lake Interstate is a "dock and shore" fishing lake located southwest of Lansing. The lake features one fishing pier, on the southern section of the lake, though fishing from the shore is possible as well. The lake is available for residents to use year round, and there is no fee charged to enter. Typical fish found in the lake consist of catfish, largemouth bass, bullhead, sunfish, yellow perch, sucker and others. The lake is stocked with fish on occasion. Ice fishing is common on the lake during the winter months.

Highways

Lake Interstate Game Area
Lake Interstate sits on Lake Interstate Game Area, 123 acres (50 ha) of land that include a trail and hunting opportunities. The land was given to the Department of Natural Resources (DNR) by the Department of Transportation, for wildlife management purposes.

References

Bodies of water of Eaton County, Michigan
Interstate